Sara Therese Löfgren, (born 11 April 1977), is a Swedish singer known for her participation in Fame Factory and her song "Starkare" (Stronger).

Background
Löfgren started singing at the age of 12. She got a break in the talent show Fame Factory which was broadcast on TV3, performing songs like "Starkare", and "Aldrig". She participated in Melodifestivalen 2004 performing "Som stormen", which finished 7th. In 2004, she was also nominated in two categories at the Nordic Music Award". Her debut album "Starkare" sold over 60,000 copies.

She was a member of the gothic metal band Those We Don't Speak Of, later leaving the band due to pregnancy.

Discography

Album 
2004: Starkare
2009: Där maskrosorna blommar

Singles
2003: Starkare
2004: För alltid
2004: Som stormen
2004: Lite kär
2005: Fastän regnet öser ned
2006: Vägen hem
2009: Glöd
2009: Maskrosor

Cooperation with other artists
2008: Still looking for you (med Sulo)

References

External links
Official site
 Sara Löfgren at last.fm

1977 births
Living people
Women heavy metal singers
Swedish heavy metal singers
21st-century Swedish singers
21st-century Swedish women singers
Melodifestivalen contestants of 2004